The 1942 United States Senate election in Illinois took place on November 3, 1942. Incumbent Republican Charles W. Brooks was reelected.

Election information
The primaries and general election coincided with those for House and those for state elections.

Primaries were held April 14, 1942.

Democratic primary

Candidates
Lawrence Joseph Sarsfield Daly, perennial candidate
Paul Douglas, Chicago Alderman
Raymond S. McKeough, U.S. Representative from Chicago

Results

Republican primary

General election

See also
1942 United States Senate elections

References

1942
Illinois
United States Senate